A Portuguese Pointer, is a breed of dog developed as a gun dog. It is one of several pointing breeds and is mainly used in red-legged partridge hunting.

History 
The Portuguese Pointer (perdigueiro Português) arose from Iberian hunting dogs with its presence in Portugal traceable to the early twelfth century. Initially the dog was bred in royal kennels and later became a very popular hunting dog for the lower classes of society. In the eighteenth century, many English families established a presence in the region of Oporto in the business of wine production and came to know the Portuguese hunting breed which was taken to England where they played a part in the origin of the English pointer. However, during the nineteenth century when Portugal was experiencing considerable social hardships, the breed began a progressive decline. It was not until the 1920s when some breeders made an effort to salvage the breed by locating some of the ancient Portuguese dogs in the inaccessible north of Portugal. The Portuguese pedigree book was then established in 1932 and breed standard in 1938. For at least a thousand years, this dog has always had the same square head, a marked stop, triangular ears and compact look and since the 17th century, the same docked tail, and among pointing dogs all over the world just the perdigueiro and his "son" the English pointer have this kind of skull-facial convergence so typical.

Description

Size & Build 
The Portuguese Pointer is a dog of medium proportions.

When being evaluated at a conformation show, dogs judged for conformation that benefits working ability, with deviations from the standard penalised according to the amount that they interfere with working ability. The dogs are square in build, with the 10:10½ height to length ratio. The tail is docked to half, or two-thirds the natural length, and held level with the spine when the dog is excited, hanging down otherwise.

Coat & Color
The coat is short and coarse on most of the dog, being the texture of velvet on the ears and face. The Portuguese Pointer does not have an undercoat.

Standard colors recognized by the FCI include light yellow, red yellow, and yellow, both unicolored or with white markings.

Health & Lifespan 
The Portuguese Pointer has an average life expectancy of 14 years. They are considered a hardy breed with no known health issues specific to them. However, hip dysplasia, patellar lunation, cancer, and autoimmune diseases are potential health concerns for dogs of this size.

Temperament 
Portuguese Pointers are an energetic and affectionate breed. As a hunting dog, the breed are enthusiastic and dedicated. They work in close contact with their handlers and are known to be devoted companions, sometimes to the point of being "inappropriate and inconvenient" in their affections. While very sociable and dedicated to their owner, they can be aloof towards other dogs.

See also
 Dogs portal
 List of dog breeds

References

External links
 The History of Perdigueiro (or Portuguese Pointer)

FCI breeds
Gundogs
Pointers
Dog breeds originating in Portugal
Rare dog breeds